Anna Szaniawska (1730-1795), was a Polish noblewoman. She was a close friend of the king's sister Izabella Poniatowska and a prominent salonnière in Polish high society. She was also a Freemason and a known philanthropist.

References

 Maria Czeppe Anna Szaniawska w Polski Słownik Biograficzny tom XLVI wyd. 2009-2010 s. 609 wersja elektroniczna

18th-century Polish nobility
18th-century Polish women
1730 births
1795 deaths
Polish philanthropists
Polish salon-holders
18th-century philanthropists
Polish Freemasons